Robson Pereira de Andrade, known as Robinho (born July 29, 1977), is a Brazilian football player currently playing for Arriana F.C. After playing for Kavala F.C. for three years, he signed with Panthrakikos. He played there for five years in Gamma Ethniki and then promoted to the Beta Ethniki. Then a new promotion with Panthrakikos gave him the chance to play in Super League. Robinho stated that he fell in love with Komotini and the club. Although Kostas Vasilakakis, the new coach of Doxa Drama F.C., made him sigh the club, he also played to Ionikos in Athens. In 2010,he signed a team which is in a small village in Komotini called Aetos Arrianon and he gained a promotion to Delta Ethniki after finishing first both in regular season and play-offs of the local championship in Komotini with 77 points, 18 more than the second team Doxa Sosti and 22 more than the third team Spartakos Agion Theodoron.

References

1977 births
Living people
Brazilian footballers
Panthrakikos F.C. players
Kavala F.C. players
Super League Greece players
Association football defenders